Mostaganem is a province (wilaya) of Algeria. Its capital is Mostaganem.

Geography
The land relief in Mostaganem Province can be divided into four regions: the Dahra Range to the east, the Mostaganem Plateau to the south, the Chelif River valley which separates the two highland regions, and the plains on the province's southern border which lie next to the marshes of the Macta.

The Mostaganem Plateau covers eleven municipalities in the southern part of the province: Mostaganem, Ain Tedles, Sour, Bouguirat, Sirat, Souaflia, Mesra, Ain Sidi Cherif, Mansourah, Touahria and Sayada. It is a semi-arid and sandy plateau, in the shape of a triangle and bounded to the north by the Chelif River. It receives 350 mm of rainfall per year.

During French colonization, viticulture was introduced on the plateau. After the country's independence, it was replaced by irrigated market gardening and the culture of citrus fruits and cereals. However, in certain sectors east of Mostaganem, the replacement of the vineyards caused the appearance of small dunes as a consequence of the resumption of soil movement.

History
In 1984 Relizane Province was carved out of its territory.

Administrative divisions
The province is divided into 10 districts (daïras), which are further divided into 32 communes or municipalities.

Districts

 Achacha
 Aïn Nouïssy
 Aïn Tédelès
 Bouguirat
 Hassi Mamèche
 Kheïr Eddine
 Mesra
 Mostaganem
 Sidi Ali
 Sidi Lakhdar

Communes

 Achacha (Achaacha)
 Aïn Boudinar
 Aïn Nouïssy
 Aïn Sidi Chérif
 Aïn Tédelès (Ain Tedles)
 Benabdelmalek Ramdane (Abdelmalek Ramdane)
 Bouguirat
 El Hassaine
 Fornaka
 Hadjadj
 Hassi Mamèche (Hasi Mameche)
 Khadra
 Kheïr Eddine (Kheiredine)
 Mansourah
 Mazagran (Mazagrain, Mezghrane)
 Mesra
 Mostaganem
 Nékmaria
 Oued El Kheïr
 Ouled Boughalem
 Ouled Malah (Ouled Maalef)
 Safsaf (Saf Saf)
 Sayada
 Sidi Ali
 Sidi Bellater (Sidi Belatar)
 Sidi Lakhdar (Sidi Lakhdaara)
 Sirat
 Souaflia
 Sour
 Stidia
 Tazgait
 Touahria

References

 
Provinces of Algeria
States and territories established in 1974